Euarestoides acutangulus is a species of fruit fly in the family Tephritidae.

Distribution
United States and Mexico

References

Tephritinae
Insects described in 1869
Diptera of North America